The area of Mississippi Territory was increased in 1804 and again in 1812.

On December 10, 1817, Mississippi was admitted into the Union as a state and Alabama Territory to the east was spun off.

List of delegates representing the district 
On April 7, 1798, the Mississippi Territory was created. A non-voting delegate was elected at-large beginning March 4, 1801.

References 

Territory
Mississippi Territory
Mississippi Territory
Constituencies established in 1801
1801 establishments in Mississippi Territory
1817 disestablishments in Mississippi Territory
Constituencies disestablished in 1817